The 1951 Pacific Tigers football team represented the College of the Pacific during the 1951 college football season. Pacific played home games in Pacific Memorial Stadium in Stockton, California.

Pacific competed as an independent in 1951.  In their first season under head coach Ernie Jorge, the Tigers finished the regular season with a record of six wins and four losses (6–4) and were ranked as high as #16 during the season. At the end of the season, Pacific was invited to a New Years Day bowl game for the second time in their history (also at the end of the 1946 season). On January 1, 1952, they played Texas Tech in the Sun Bowl, losing 25–14. That brought their record to six wins and five losses (6–5). For the season they outscored their opponents 275–216.

Schedule

Team players in the NFL
The following College of the Pacific players were selected in the 1952 NFL Draft.

Notes

References

Pacific
Pacific Tigers football seasons
Pacific Tigers football